Zhang Banglun (July 1919 – 5 December 2001) was a Chinese footballer. He competed in the men's tournament at the 1948 Summer Olympics.

References

External links
 

1919 births
2001 deaths
Chinese footballers
China international footballers
Olympic footballers of China
Footballers at the 1948 Summer Olympics
Association football goalkeepers